The 2000 Valencian Community motorcycle Grand Prix was the thirteenth round of the 2000 Grand Prix motorcycle racing season. It took place on 17 September 2000 at the Circuit de Valencia.

Until Fabio Quartararo's victory at the 2020 Spanish GP, it was the last premier class win for Yamaha as a satellite customer team.

500 cc classification

250 cc classification

125 cc classification

Championship standings after the race (500cc)

Below are the standings for the top five riders and constructors after round thirteen has concluded. 

Riders' Championship standings

Constructors' Championship standings

 Note: Only the top five positions are included for both sets of standings.

References

Valencian Community motorcycle Grand Prix
Valencian
Valencian Community Motorcycle Grand Prix
21st century in Valencia